Polygon Man was an early marketing character for the Sony PlayStation in North America.  He appeared in the consoles pre-launch ads commenting on various launch games but was dropped before the launch of Sony's first console and replaced by a series of popular game characters starting with Sofia from Battle Arena Toshinden, Parappa the Rapper, and Crash Bandicoot. An advertisement featuring Polygon Man paired with the phrase "It's more powerful than God" has been cited as an example of Sony's willingness to advertise to its teenage audience much more aggressively.

History
The creation of Polygon Man originated from strong opposition to the PlayStation brand name from the American arm of Sony Computer Entertainment(SCEA). Market research had shown that the youth audience that was the target market had reacted badly to the PlayStation name. SCEA were firmly in favour of using PSX as the name for the console, so much so that they broke with official marketing and called it PSX on early trade promotions and even commissioned their own marketing character, Polygon Man.

Chiat/Day, SCEA's advertising agency had conducted consumer research and identified a target age of 17; the logic behind the decision was that 12-year-olds want to be 17 and 25-year-olds want to be 17 again. Polygon Man was envisioned as a "next-gen spokesman" to talk to consumers. The character was influenced by the successful anarchic Pirate TV campaign in the UK by Sega in the early 90s. The branding was the opposite of the minimalist branding vision that Sony Japan had for the console.
Looking back at the events, Chris Deering, former head of PlayStation Europe, commented that SCEA's actions upset Sony in Japan because they interpreted it as SCEA fighting against the PlayStation brand, whereas Deering said he could see that SCEA's actual aim was to dodge the PlayStation brand.

Phil Harrison, then head of Sony's European game publishing business, recollected the reaction of Ken Kutaragi, global head of the PlayStation brand, when Kutaragi saw the Polygon Man for the first time.

"I remember walking onto the E3 booth in 1995 with Ken and seeing the Polygon Man design on the side of the booth. Ken just went absolutely insane," said Harrison. Kutaragi was upset that SCEA was spending its limited budget on an alternative brand. "But the thing that really upset Ken was that the Polygon Man design wasn’t Gouraud shaded, it was flat shaded! So Polygon Man was taken out into the car park and quietly shot."

In 2012, Polygon Man resurfaced as the main antagonist and final boss of fighting game PlayStation All-Stars Battle Royale. It is assumed that he gathers famous PlayStation mascots to fight each other as a form of revenge.

References

Video game mascots
PlayStation (brand)
Corporate mascots
Male characters in advertising
Mascots introduced in 1995
PlayStation (console)
Sony
Sony Interactive Entertainment antagonists
Video game bosses
Video game marketing